Long Jinguang (1863 – 1917) was an ethnic Hani Chinese general of the late Qing and early Republican period of China. He was the older brother of Chinese general Long Jiguang. Both brothers supported Yuan Shikai's restoration of the monarchy.

References 

Hani people
Qing dynasty generals
1863 births
1917 deaths
Republic of China warlords from Yunnan
People from Honghe
Empire of China (1915–1916)